The Beebe House is located in Platteville, Wisconsin.

Its style is Victorian Gothic.

History
William Beebe served in the Union Army during the American Civil War, reaching the rank of captain. He would also become Mayor of Platteville.

References

Houses on the National Register of Historic Places in Wisconsin
National Register of Historic Places in Grant County, Wisconsin
Houses in Grant County, Wisconsin
Gothic Revival architecture in Wisconsin
Brick buildings and structures
Houses completed in 1870